Antony Andrewes,  (12 June 1910 – 13 June 1990) was an English classical scholar and historian. He was Wykeham Professor of Ancient History at the University of Oxford from 1953 to 1977.

Early life
Andrewes was born in Tavistock, Devon, England, on 12 June 1910. He was educated at Winchester College from 1923 to 1929. He studied at New College, Oxford, between 1929 and 1933.

Career

Academic career
Andrewes was a Fellow of Pembroke College, Oxford, between 1933 and 1946, and of New College, Oxford, from 1946 to 1953. He was Wykeham Professor of Ancient History from 1953 until his retirement in 1977.

Military service
On 20 June 1941, he was commissioned in the Intelligence Corps, British Army, as a second lieutenant. His service number was 191239. By January 1945, he was a captain (temporary major).

Later life
He died in 1990, the day after his 80th birthday.

Honours
On 4 January 1945, Andrewes was appointed Member of the military division of the Order of the British Empire (MBE) 'in recognition of gallant and distinguished service in the field'. He was elected a Fellow of the British Academy in 1957.

Works
 The Greek tyrants (1956)
 The Greeks (1967); later republished as Greek society
 "The Peace of Nicias and the Sicilian Expedition" and "The Spartan Resurgence", in D. M. Lewis, John Boardman, J. K. Davies, M. Ostwald (editors), Cambridge Ancient History, vol. V, The Fifth Century B.C., Cambridge University Press, 1992, pp. 433–498 [posthumous].

References

  The Greeks (biographical sketch)
 Pembroke College, Fellows in the 1930s

1910 births
1990 deaths
Writers from Tavistock
English classical scholars
People educated at Winchester College
Alumni of New College, Oxford
Fellows of Pembroke College, Oxford
Fellows of New College, Oxford
Institute for Advanced Study visiting scholars
Wykeham Professors of Ancient History
Members of the Order of the British Empire
Fellows of the British Academy
Classical scholars of the University of Oxford